Lord Finesse (born Robert Hall Jr., February 19, 1970) is an American rapper and hip-hop record producer from The Bronx, New York best known as the leader of the D.I.T.C. crew. About.com ranked him number 29 on its list of the Top-50 Hip-Hop Producers.

Career
In 1989, Finesse and his former partner DJ Mike Smooth signed with Wild Pitch Records, home of other popular hip hop artists such as Gang Starr, Main Source, Chill Rob G, Percee P and O.C. In 1990, the duo released their debut album Funky Technician. The album featured production from future star beat-makers DJ Premier, Diamond D and Showbiz. Soon after, Finesse formed the popular New York underground crew D.I.T.C., an acronym for "Diggin In The Crates", together with Showbiz and A.G. and Diamond D. Future members included Fat Joe, O.C., Buckwild, and Big L.

Finesse returned as a solo artist in early 1992 with his second effort, Return of the Funky Man. The album featured guest appearances from Percee P and AG. The album's title track peaked at number 13 on the Hot Rap Singles chart. Return of the Funky Man also included a couple of songs that were produced by Finesse himself, and this would be the start of a career as a much respected hip-hop producer. In 1994 Finesse made a production appearance on The Notorious B.I.G.'s classic debut Ready to Die, on the track "Suicidal Thoughts". In 1995, he produced a big portion of Big L's debut album Lifestylez Ov Da Poor & Dangerous, including the single "M.V.P." and made an appearance on one of the album's highlight songs "Da Graveyard". He returned as an artist in 1996 with the now rare 12" single "Check The Method" and then the acclaimed album The Awakening. Finesse produced the entire album himself, and enlisted a large number of guests, including KRS-One, MC Lyte, Akinyele, Diamond D, Showbiz & A.G., O.C. and Kid Capri. The underground single "Actual Facts" featuring Sadat X, Large Professor and Grand Puba, was included as a hidden track on the album.

Finesse hasn't released a studio album since this effort, but has continued his production work. In 1997, he produced the title track to O.C.'s acclaimed effort Jewelz and the track "Channel 10" off of Capone-N-Noreaga's debut The War Report. Finesse released a mixtape called Diggin' On Blue in 1999. Later in the year, he produced the track "The Message" on Dr. Dre's seminal 2001 album. Finesse is currently working on a Funky Technician remix project, as well as a new D.I.T.C. album. Along with these projects, he and DJ Premier are working on a posthumous Big L album.

In 1998, Finesse provided the vocal sample on the hook to "The Rockafeller Skank", a hit single by British musician Fatboy Slim from his album You've Come a Long Way, Baby. The song features Finesse's repeated line "Right about now, the funk soul brother. Check it out now, the funk soul brother". This line was lifted from the song "Vinyl Dogs Vibe" by the Vinyl Dogs with the spoken word intro provided by Finesse, edited from the full line, "Check it out right about now. It's no other than the funk soul brother, the Lord Finesse. And you're welcome to the world of the Vinyl Dogs right about now. So if you're diggin', peep how we do it like this"

Lord Finesse returned to the mic on Handsome Boy Modeling School's album White People in 2004.  He was featured on the song entitled "Rock 'N' Roll (Could Never Hip-Hop Like This) pt. 2", collaborating with famous old-school DJ's  Grand Wizard Theodore and Jazzy Jay. Chester Bennington and Mike Shinoda from Linkin Park make appearances, as well as Rahzel, then of The Roots.

In June 2012, Finesse filed a $10 million lawsuit against Rostrum Records and DatPiff for the use of a sample of Finesse's song "Hip 2 Da Game" used in Mac Miller's 2010 song "Kool-Aid and Frozen Pizza." In January 2013 the lawsuit was settled for an undisclosed amount.

In 2014, Lord Finesse produced a remix for Swedish rap group Looptroop Rockers single "Another Love Song".

In July 2020 he released a new remix album, Motown State Of Mind.

Discography

Albums

Singles

References

1970 births
Living people
African-American male rappers
American hip hop record producers
Diggin' in the Crates Crew members
Five percenters
Giant Records (Warner) artists
Rappers from the Bronx
Underground rappers
Wild Pitch Records artists
Place of birth missing (living people)
20th-century American rappers
21st-century American rappers
Record producers from New York (state)